The Women's road race of the 2017 UCI Road World Championships is a cycling event that took place on 23 September 2017 in Bergen, Norway. It was won by Chantal Blaak of the Netherlands, ahead of Australian Katrin Garfoot and the defending champion, Amalie Dideriksen of Denmark.

Course
The race started and finished on the Festplassen in Bergen, with the riders completing eight laps of a circuit  in length.

Qualification
Qualification was based mainly on the UCI World Ranking by nations as of 15 August 2017. The first five nations in this classification qualified seven riders to start, the next ten nations qualified six riders to start and the next five nations qualified five riders to start. All other nations had the possibility to send three riders to start. In addition to this number, the outgoing World Champion and the current continental champions were also able to take part.

Continental champions

UCI World Ranking by Nations
Rankings as at 15 August 2017.

Participating nations
153 cyclists from 47 nations were entered in the women's road race, however Cuba's sole representative Marlies Mejías did not start the race. The number of cyclists per nation is shown in parentheses.

 
 
 
 
 
 
 
 
 
  (did not start)

Final classification

References

External links
Road race page at Bergen 2017 website

Women's road race
UCI Road World Championships – Women's road race
2017 in women's road cycling